"My Romance" is a popular jazz song, with music by Richard Rodgers and lyrics by Lorenz Hart, written for Billy Rose's musical, Jumbo (1935). Gloria Grafton and Donald Novis introduced the song in that musical.

In the 1962 movie version of Jumbo, Doris Day performed the song.

The song's lyrics describe a romantic attraction between two people, often by listing elements that are not needed to make this attraction work. In turn, the singer states that the romance does not need a certain setting ("a moon in the sky"), location ("a blue lagoon"), or stereotypical dating accompaniment ("soft guitars"), due to the strong attraction to the person.

Other versions
 Dave Brubeck – The Dave Brubeck Quartet (1952)
 Bill Evans – The Complete Village Vanguard (1961)
 Doris Day – 1962
 Johnny Smith – The Man with the Blue Guitar (1962)
 Ben Webster with Hank Jones – Ben and Sweets (1962)
 Art Blakey with Keith Jarrett – Buttercorn Lady (1966)
 Jessica Williams – Portraits (1977)
 Warne Marsh – A Ballad Album (1983)
 Tuck & Patti – Tears of Joy (1988)
 Carly Simon – My Romance (1990)
 Chris Botti – When I Fall in Love (2004)
 Aaron Tveit –  The Radio in My Head: Live at 54 Below (2013)
 Debbie Gravitte
 Mario Lanza
 Ben Taylor
 James Taylor
 Sammy Davis Jr.
 Roberta Flack
 Cybill Shepherd

See also
List of 1930s jazz standards

References 

1935 songs
1930s jazz standards
Songs with music by Richard Rodgers
Songs with lyrics by Lorenz Hart
Songs from Rodgers and Hart musicals